The Kralingse Plas is a lake located in the suburb of Kralingen in Rotterdam, the Netherlands. The water is mainly used for watersport, fishing and recreational activities. Several sport associations are located around the lake, including rowing, sailing and fishing.

The Kralingse Plas was created due to peat extractions.

References 

Lakes of the Netherlands
Geography of Rotterdam